Nordland I is the eleventh studio album by Swedish extreme metal band Bathory. It was released on 18 November 2002 through Black Mark Production. It is a return to the Viking metal of Bathory's middle period, and features songs mainly concerning Norse mythology.

Track listing

Personnel 
 Quorthon – all instruments
 Kristian Wåhlin – album cover artwork

References 

Bathory (band) albums
2002 albums
Viking metal albums